Guy Williams may refer to:

Sir Guy Williams (British Army officer) (1881–1959), British Army general during World War II
Guy Williams (politician) (1907–1992), Canadian Senator and First Nations leader
Guy Williams (actor) (1924–1989), American actor and former fashion model
Guy Williams (basketball) (born 1960), American basketball player, nicknamed "The Fly"
Guy Williams (equestrian) (born 1971), British international showjumper
Guy Williams (rugby league) (born 1984), Australian rugby league player
Guy Williams (comedian) (born 1987), New Zealand comedian and television personality
Guy Williams (visual effects), Academy Award-nominated visual effects supervisor
R. Guy Williams, model railway locomotive modeller, known for his contributions to the Pendon Museum

See also
Gus Williams (disambiguation)